Aramu (also Romanized as Āramū and Armū) is a village in Aramu Rural District, in the Central District of Darreh Shahr County, Ilam Province, Iran. At the 2006 census, its population was 2,408, in 501 families. The village is populated by Kurds.

References 

Populated places in Darreh Shahr County
Kurdish settlements in Ilam Province